Gora may refer to several rural localities in Russia.

Moscow Oblast
As of 2009, six rural localities in Moscow Oblast bear this name:
Gora, Dmitrovsky District, Moscow Oblast, a village in Dmitrovsky District
Gora (Davydovskoye Rural Settlement), Orekhovo-Zuyevsky District, Moscow Oblast, a village in Orekhovo-Zuyevsky District; municipally a part of Davydovskoye Rural Settlement
Gora (Gorskoye Rural Settlement), Orekhovo-Zuyevsky District, Moscow Oblast, a village in Orekhovo-Zuyevsky District; municipally a part of Gorskoye Rural Settlement
Gora, Pavlovo-Posadsky District, Moscow Oblast, a village in Pavlovo-Posadsky District
Gora, Shatursky District, Moscow Oblast, a village in Shatursky District
Gora, Yegoryevsky District, Moscow Oblast, a village in Yegoryevsky District

Perm Krai
Gora, Alexandrovsky District, Perm Krai

Vladimir Oblast
As of 2009, one rural locality in Vladimir Oblast bears this name:
Gora, Vladimir Oblast, a village in Petushinsky District

Other
Gora, name of several other rural localities in Russia